Madala Louis David Ntombela is a South African politician. A member of the African National Congress, he was elected as an ANC Member of the National Assembly of South Africa in 2014 and re-elected in 2019. Ntombela currently serves as House Chairperson for International Relations.

Ntombela is married to the current Premier of the Free State, Sisi Ntombela; both are former mayors of Tweeling.

References

External links

Profile at Parliament of South Africa

Living people
Year of birth missing (living people)
Place of birth missing (living people)
Zulu people
Mayors of places in South Africa
Members of the National Assembly of South Africa
African National Congress politicians